British Cricket Balls Ltd is a British sports equipment company, specialising in cricket equipment. The company notably manufactures the Dukes brand of cricket ball used by the England cricket team in UK Test cricket, and which traces its origins to 1760. The Dukes ball is also used by the West Indies cricket team in their home Test matches.

Cricket products marketed by the company include balls, bats, batting gloves, and pads. The current owner is Dilip Jajodia.

History 
The Duke family began hand-manufacturing cricket balls as a cottage industry at Redleaf Hill, Penshurst, Kent, England, around 1760 and continuing until 1841. Having gained the Royal patent for their cricket balls in 1775, Duke & Son made the first-ever six-seam cricket ball, which was presented to the then Prince of Wales and used for the 1780 English cricket season. In 1851, their triple-sewn ball won a prize medal at the Great Exhibition. And in 1881, another Dukes ball won a gold medal at the Melbourne International Exhibition.

In 1920, Duke & Son merged with John Wisden & Co, a manufacturer of cricket bats.

In 1999, the company introduced the controversial white ball for that year's Cricket World Cup.

See also
 Kookaburra Sport
 Sanspareils Greenlands (SG)

References

External links
 

Sportswear brands
Cricket equipment manufacturers
Sporting goods manufacturers of the United Kingdom